Each year the Minnesota Miss Basketball award is given to the person chosen as the best high school girls basketball player in the U.S. state of Minnesota.  The honor has been awarded annually since 1978 by the Minnesota Girls Basketball Coaches Association.

The award has generally been given to one recipient each year.  However, in 1984, no award was given, and in the years 1985–1989, awards were given to two winners, from Class A and Class AA.

Award winners

See also
Minnesota Mr. Basketball

References

Mr. and Miss Basketball awards
High school sports in Minnesota
Awards established in 1978
1978 establishments in Minnesota
Women's sports in Minnesota
Basketball players from Minnesota
Lists of people from Minnesota
Lists of American sportswomen
American women's basketball players
Minnesota sports-related lists